Benjamin McDonald Wikler (born February 3, 1981) is an American politician and the chairman of the Democratic Party of Wisconsin since July 2019.  He is a former Senior Advisor at MoveOn.

Early life and education 
Ben Wikler grew up in Madison, Wisconsin, where he cofounded The Yellow Press, a student-run newspaper. While a student, he won election to the student senate and launched Students United in Defense of Schools with Peter Koechley to demand increased school funding and succeeded in allowing students to elect a representative to the Madison School Board. He also organized protests against granting Coca-Cola exclusive access to Madison schools. During high school he also worked for Wisconsin gubernatorial candidate Ed Garvey and on the first congressional campaign of now-Senator Tammy Baldwin.

In 1999, he began attending Harvard University, where he studied economics. While a student, he cofounded the Student Global AIDS Campaign (SGAC) and the Harvard AIDS Coalition. He represented the SGAC at the United Nations General Assembly Special Session on AIDS in New York City, the UN World Youth Forum in Senegal, and the International AIDS Conference in Barcelona. He also worked for economist Jeffrey Sachs and interned for Russ Feingold. He also served as editor-in-chief of the Harvard Review of Philosophy and contributed to The Onion.

While at Harvard, he joined TeamFranken, a group of students who assisted Al Franken in writing his No. 1 bestseller, Lies and the Lying Liars Who Tell Them: A Fair and Balanced Look at the Right. Wikler took a term off to help Franken "through every step of the process" of writing the book. "When I was staying with the Frankens [to finish the book], we'd get up around 10 or 11 and then work for fourteen or fifteen hours," he told an interviewer. "We'd stop only for meals and a little break before dinner. It was exhausting, but it was also exhilarating, because he's so funny. We were constantly cracking up."

Career 
After college, he became a founding producer for Al Franken's radio show, The Al Franken Show where he assisted with Franken's sequel, The Truth (With Jokes). "It would not have been possible without Ben Wikler," Franken writes. "Ben reminds me of myself when I was his age, except smarter, wiser, more worldly, better read, more passionate, much much taller, and just as funny. Ben was with me every step of the way on this book. I cannot thank him enough."

In 2006, Wikler served as press secretary for Sherrod Brown's U.S. Senate campaign and was the first editor-in-chief of Comedy 23/6, a comedy news website created as a coproduction of the Huffington Post and IAC.

In March 2007, he became Campaign Director for Avaaz, where he helped grow the organization to over ten million members. As Campaign Director, he ran campaigns on climate change, poverty, human rights, and other issues, as well as managed the technology and communication teams. He also hosted the Fossil of the Day Awards at UN climate negotiations from 2007–2009 for the Climate Action Network. In late 2011, Wikler became the Executive Vice President of Change.org.

In January 2012, Wikler and Aaron Swartz launched a radio show and podcast, The Flaming Sword of Justice, on We Act Radio WPWC 1480 AM in Washington DC, in which he interviews other campaigners from the U.S. and around the world. Guests have included Ricken Patel, Zack Exley, and Eli Pariser.

The Good Fight 
In November 2013, Wikler relaunched his show as The Good Fight, a podcast and radio program sponsored by MoveOn.org. The show's first episode featured Senator Al Franken and reached the #1 spot on the U.S. iTunes podcast charts. The Good Fight is an hour-long weekly podcast and radio show that, according to its website, "brings you a mix of comedy, activism, and David versus Goliath battles told from the behind-the-slingshot point of view.

The Guardian referred to The Good Fight as "road signs through political issues that seemed permanently blocked" and Wikler referred to it as a "behind-the-slingshot view of David v Goliath battles."

Guests ranged from unknown grassroots activists to U.S. Senators. New episodes were posted every Thursday, and aired on 1480 AM in DC every Tuesday and Friday at 3 pm.".

Prominent scholar, activist and 2016 presidential candidate Lawrence Lessig is an outspoken supporter of Wikler and The Good Fight. He made a personal appeal on his blog for his readers to support a Kickstarter campaign to fund The Good Fight.

The podcast is currently on hiatus. In a letter to his supporters dated February 21, 2016, Wikler cites family needs as the reason for ceasing production of the podcast, and offers to return Kickstarter funds to any supporter who requests it.

MoveOn.org 
Wikler became MoveOn.org's Washington director in early 2014.

He led the organization's efforts to encourage Elizabeth Warren to run for President, putting him at odds with friend and prominent progressive Howard Dean who endorsed Hillary Clinton. Dean declined to criticize the effort and Wikler, saying, "I appreciate you trying to pick a fight between Ben and I . I happen to know Ben, and he’s one of the smartest people under 35 in the entire country."

In late 2015 Wikler led MoveOn's advocacy on behalf of Syrian immigrants, helping to organize and coordinate efforts by a number of nonprofit groups.

In 2017, Wikler led grassroots protests against the attempted repeal of the Affordable Care Act, helping contribute to the Senate's failure to pass the ACA-repealing American Health Care Act of 2017.

Chair of the Democratic Party of Wisconsin 
Wikler announced his campaign for chair of the Democratic Party of Wisconsin (DPW) on February 21, 2019, running on a slate with Felesia Martin and Lee Snodgrass. On June 2, 2019, Wikler was elected chair of DPW. He received 1,006 votes, beating opposing candidate state Rep. David Bowen who earned 233 votes.

Since assuming office, Wikler has emphasized that "Wisconsin is not only a necessary state, but may be the necessary state to stop Trump and elect a Democratic president." He's also highlighted DPW's focus on grassroots organizing: "Unlike almost any other state party in the country, we have a field team of organizers working across Wisconsin to build neighborhood teams and work with county parties to get volunteers out on doors." As of September 3, 2019, DPW's team includes 13 field organizers in every region of the state.

Personal life 
Wikler and his wife Beth live with their three children and dog in Madison, Wisconsin. His father, Daniel I. Wikler, is a philosopher and ethicist at Harvard School of Public Health; his mother, Lynn McDonald, is a psychologist and senior scientist at the Wisconsin Center for Education Research and the University of Wisconsin–Madison.

References

External links

1981 births
American male bloggers
American bloggers
American podcasters
American political activists
Harvard College alumni
Living people
Writers from Madison, Wisconsin
Democratic Party of Wisconsin chairs
Wisconsin Democrats
2020 United States presidential electors